Tel Te'omim is a community settlement in the Beit She'an valley in northern Israel. Located about 6 km south of Beit She'an, just east of Highway 90, it falls under the jurisdiction of Valley of Springs Regional Council.

History
The village was founded in 1982 as an expansion of the three other moshavim in its vicinity: Revaya, Rehov, and Sde Trumot. Together these four settlements are combined in the "Bikurah" bloc.  The population of Tel Te'omim is mostly composed of people who originally lived in the original three moshavim.

The name "Tel Te'omim", which means "twin hills" or the "hill of twins", is associated with a pair of nearby hills of archaeological interest.

References

Community settlements
Populated places established in 1982
Populated places in Northern District (Israel)
1982 establishments in Israel